Stasys Povilaitis  (15 January 1947 – 6 October 2015) was a Lithuanian singer/maestro. He was born in Kaunas and died in Palanga.

In 2010 he started his ''TV'' career on channel ''TV3'' which was called ''Šeimų dainos'' and he was chairman of the commission.

See also
List of Lithuanian singers

References

External links
 Умер певец Стасис Повилайтис // kurier.lt, 7-10-2015
 Stasys Povilaitis | Lrytas.lt

This article was initially translated from the Lithuanian Wikipedia.

1947 births
2015 deaths
20th-century Lithuanian male singers
Musicians from Kaunas
21st-century Lithuanian male singers